Paulus Masehe is a professional footballer for Free State Stars.

References

1983 births
Living people
Orlando Pirates F.C. players
Free State Stars F.C. players
Association football midfielders
South African soccer players